"Doom and Gloom" is the lead single taken from GRRR!, the 50th anniversary compilation album by the Rolling Stones. It was premiered on BBC Radio 2 on 11 October 2012. The song's recording marked the first time that Mick Jagger, Keith Richards, Charlie Watts and Ronnie Wood had been in the studio together for seven years, since completing their 2005 album A Bigger Bang. A lyric video was released on YouTube the same day.

The song charted at No. 61 on the UK Singles Chart, No. 26 on the Billboard Japan Hot 100 and No. 30 on the Billboard Rock Songs chart in October 2012.

Rolling Stone magazine named "Doom and Gloom" the eighteenth best song of 2012.

Composition
This song represents a reversion to the "open G" guitar tuning that powered Sticky Fingers and Exile on Main Street. The song's opening riff is played by Jagger. Richards commented on Jagger being the driving force behind the song and Jagger playing the opening riff: "I don't give a damn. He'd never have learned how to play that without me teaching him how to do it."

Music video
A music video for the song was released on 20 November 2012 and was directed by Jonas Åkerlund at the Cité du Cinéma in Saint-Denis starring Noomi Rapace.

Benny Benassi Remix
 Doom And Gloom (Benny Benassi Remix) – 5:00

Personnel
Mick Jagger – vocals, rhythm guitar, percussion, production
Keith Richards – rhythm guitar, production
Ronnie Wood – lead guitar, lap steel guitar
Charlie Watts – drums

Additional musicians
Darryl Jones – bass guitar
Chuck Leavell – Hammond organ
Jeff Bhasker – Moog and Juno synthesizers, production
Emile Haynie – drum programming, production

Charts

In popular culture

The song was played in the fourth episode of the 2012 NBC series Do No Harm (TV series), when Ian arrives at a formal event.

The song was played in the end credits to the 2013 film A Good Day to Die Hard.

The song also plays in the 2019 film Avengers: Endgame, when the Avengers gather together and construct a time machine.

References

External links
Music video

2012 singles
The Rolling Stones songs
Song recordings produced by Jeff Bhasker
Song recordings produced by Jagger–Richards
Songs written by Jagger–Richards
Song recordings produced by Emile Haynie
Music videos directed by Jonas Åkerlund
2012 songs
Universal Music Group singles